Mali Prolog  is a village in Dubrovnik-Neretva County, Croatia on the border with Bosnia and Herzegovina. It is connected by the D222 highway, just northwest of Pojezerje. In 2001 it had a population of 55.

References

Populated places in Dubrovnik-Neretva County